Ringerike refers to various areas and organizations in Norway:
Ringerike (municipality)
Ringerike (traditional district)

Other meanings
Ringerikes Blad
Ringerike District Court
Ringerike GP
Ringerike Hospital
Ringerike Line
Ringerike Panthers
Ringerike Prison
Ringerike Style